Media circus is a colloquial metaphor, or idiom, describing a news event for which the level of media coverage—measured by such factors as the number of reporters at the scene and the amount of material broadcast or published—is perceived to be excessive or out of proportion to the event being covered. Coverage that is sensationalistic can add to the perception the event is the subject of a media circus. The term is meant to critique the coverage of the event by comparing it to the spectacle and pageantry of a circus. Usage of the term in this sense became common in the 1970s. It can also be called a media feeding frenzy or just media frenzy, especially when they cover the media coverage.

History

Although the idea is older, the term media circus began to appear around the mid-1970s. An early example is from the 1976 book by author Lynn Haney, in which she writes about a romance in which the athlete Chris Evert was involved: "Their courtship, after all, had been a 'media circus.'" A few years later The Washington Post had a similar courtship example in which it reported, "Princess Grace herself is still traumatized by the memory of her own media-circus wedding to Prince Rainier in 1956." The term has become increasingly popular with time since the 1970s. Reasons for being critical of the media are varied; at the core of most criticism is that there may be a significant opportunity cost when other more important news issues get less public attention as a result of coverage of the hyped issue.

Media circuses make up the central plot device in the 1951 movie Ace in the Hole about a self-interested reporter who, covering a mine disaster, allows a man to die trapped underground. It cynically examines the relationship between the media and the news they report. The movie was subsequently re-issued as The Big Carnival, with "carnival" referring to what we now call a "circus".
In the film, the disaster attracts campers including a real circus.
The movie was based on real-life Floyd Collins who in 1925 was trapped in a Kentucky cave drawing so much media attention that it became the third largest media event between the two World Wars (the other two being Lindbergh's solo flight and the Lindbergh kidnapping).

Examples
Events described as a media circus include:

Aruba
 The disappearance, and assumed death, of Natalee Holloway (2005–)

Australia
 The Azaria Chamberlain disappearance of 2-month-old baby in outback Australia (1980)
 The Beaconsfield Mine collapse (2006)
 2009 Violence against Indians in Australia controversy
 Schapelle Corby Drug smuggler (2014)

Brazil
 The murder of Isabella Nardoni (2008)

Canada
 Conrad Black, business magnate of newspapers, convicted of fraud, embezzlement and corporate destruction, imprisoned in Florida (2007)
 Toronto mayor Rob Ford's life, including his usage of drugs, alcohol and involvement with organized crime (2013)
 Paul Bernardo and Karla Homolka (serial killers) (1987–1990)
 Omar Khadr (detained as a minor at Guantanamo Bay in 2001, transferred to Canada in 2012, released in May 2015)
 Luka Rocco Magnotta and the Murder of Jun Lin (2012)

Chile
 2010 Copiapó mining accident (2010)

Colombia
 The Death of Luis Andres Colmenares (2010)

Germany
 The Gladbeck hostage crisis (1988)

Italy
 Amanda Knox (convicted of the murder of Meredith Kercher; her conviction was subsequently overturned) (2015)

Malaysia
 The missing Malaysia Airlines Flight 370 (2014)

Mexico
 The kidnapping of 4 American citizens in Matamoros (2023)

Peru
 Hostage situation in the Japanese ambassador's residence (1997)
 Joran van der Sloot and the death of Stephany Flores Ramirez (2010)

Philippines
 Pepsi Number Fever 349 incident (1992)
 Murders of Eileen Sarmenta and Allan Gomez (1993)
 Manila Film Festival scandal (1994)
 PhilSports Stadium stampede (2006)
 Manila hostage crisis (2010)
 Vhong Navarro assault incident (2014)
 Good conduct time allowance controversy (2019)
 PNP Ninja cops controversy (2019)
 Barretto sisters controversy (2019)
 ABS-CBN franchise renewal controversy (2020)
 PhilHealth corruption scandal (2020)
 Marichu Mauro maltreatment case (2020–21)
 Philippine Government–Sinovac Biotech purchase controversy (2020–21)
 2020 Tarlac shooting (2020–21)
 Death of Christine Dacera (2021–22)
 Tim Yap birthday party controversy (2021)
 2021 PNP–PDEA shootout (2021)
 2021 PDP–Laban dispute (2021–22)
 Pharmally pandemic deals scandal (2021–22)
 Deped laptop deals scandal (2022)
 2022 Philippine sugar crisis (2022)

Poland
 The assumed discovery of the Nazi gold train in Wałbrzych (Waldenburg) (2015)

Romania
 Disappearance and alleged murder of Elodia Ghinescu, especially on OTV, which aired a couple hundred episodes on the matter (2007)

South Africa
 Oscar Pistorius on trial for death of his girlfriend Reeva Steenkamp (2013–14)

South Korea
 Suicide and funeral of K-pop star and Shinee member Kim Jong-hyun (2017)
 Seoul Halloween crowd crush (2022)

Thailand
 Tham Luang cave rescue (2018)

Ukraine
 Mykola Melnychenko's involvement in the Cassette Scandal (1999–2000)

United Kingdom
 The Charlie Gard case (2017)
 The life, career, death and funeral of Jade Goody (2009)
 The News International phone hacking scandal, often overshadowed stories on the Libyan/Syrian Civil Wars, East African famine, and economic crisis (2011)
 The disappearance of Madeleine McCann (2008).
 The McLibel case (1997)
 Feud between Meghan Markle/Prince Harry and the Royal family (2020–2023)

United States

 The 1924 murder trials of Beulah Annan, Belva Gærtner, and several other female suspects in Chicago, adapted into the Chicago franchise by a newspaper reporter
 The early 1930s string of public enemies, ranging from mafia leaders such as Al Capone to smaller-time gangsters, most enduringly famously Bonnie and Clyde
 The 1954 trial of Sam Sheppard. The U.S. Supreme Court held "massive, pervasive, and prejudicial publicity" prevented him from receiving a fair trial
 The 1965 littering trial against singer Arlo Guthrie and Richard Robbins, deliberately turned into a local media circus by arresting officer William Obanhein to deter others from repeating their actions
 Coverage of the investigation and trial of the 1969 murders of Sharon Tate and four others by the Manson family
 David Gelman, Peter Greenberg, et al. in Newsweek on January 31, 1977: "Brooklyn born photographer and film producer Lawrence Schiller managed to make himself the sole journalist to witness the execution of Gary Gilmore in Utah....In the Gilmore affair, he was like a ringmaster in what became a media circus, with sophisticated newsmen scrambling for what he had to offer"
 The 1979 trial of Ted Bundy for murdering two women at the Chi Omega sorority house at Florida State University in Tallahassee, Florida.
 The rescue of baby Jessica McClure (1987)
 The Central Park jogger case of 1989
 The O. J. Simpson murder case of 1994–95
 The Blizzard of '96 (1996), "...this storm ...so hyped by the media in the same way that the O. J. Simpson murder case became hyped as the "Trial of the century"
 The Clinton–Lewinsky scandal (1998)
 The Columbine High School massacre (1999) 
 The Elián González custody conflict (2000)
 The Summer of the Shark in 2001
 The trial of Scott Peterson (2004), "The circus became even more raucous when Peterson went on trial for murder in 2004"
 The trial of Martha Stewart (2004), "The stone-faced Stewart never broke stride as she cut a path through the media circus" 
 The disappearance of Stacy Peterson (2007)
 The alleged teenage "pregnancy pact" at Glocuester High School (2008)
 The death of David Carradine (2009)
 The Casey Anthony murder trial (2011), "Once again, it was relentless media coverage that in large part fed the fascination with the case", Ford observed
 The killing of Trayvon Martin (2012), "Here is where the media circus takes a decidedly ugly turn", Eric Deggans wrote
 The murder of Travis Alexander (2013), where Jodi Arias was found guilty of first-degree murder
 The Killing of Cecil the lion (2015)
 The sexual harassment allegations against film producer Harvey Weinstein and the Weinstein effect (2017)
 Opposition to and protests against the nomination of Brett Kavanaugh and the proceedings of his Confirmation Hearings (2018)
 The murder of George Floyd and the protests that followed (2020)
 The Killing of Gabby Petito (2021)
 Will Smith slapping Chris Rock (2022)
 The Johnny Depp v Amber Heard trial (2022)
 The 2022 University of Idaho killings
 The various scandals surrounding George Santos (2022–2023)
 The trial of Alex Murdaugh (2023)
 The Chinese "spy balloon" incident (2023)

See also

 24-hour news cycle
 Cause célèbre
 CNN effect
 Deviancy amplification spiral
 "Dirty Laundry" (Don Henley song)
 Feiler faster thesis
 It's Not News, It's FARK
 Richard Jewell
 Media scrum
 Missing white woman syndrome
 Paparazzi
 Perp walk
 Political theatre
 Sensationalism
 Silly season
 Trial by media
 Trial of the century
 Yellow journalism

References

Criticism of journalism
Circus
Mass media events
Mass media issues
Media coverage and representation
Influence of mass media
Social influence
Public opinion